Utricularia vulgaris (greater bladderwort or common bladderwort) is an aquatic species of bladderwort found in Asia and Europe. The plant is free-floating and does not put down roots. Stems can attain lengths of over one metre in a single growing season, but die back and form turions in winter. The leaves are finely pinnately divided, between one and eight centimetres long and carry many bladder-like traps. The yellow flowers are borne on stalks above the surface of the water between April and August. In eastern Asia and North America, its place is taken by the related species U. macrorhiza.

References

Carnivorous plants of North America
Carnivorous plants of Europe
vulgaris
Plants described in 1753
Taxa named by Carl Linnaeus